Pola X is a 1999 drama film directed by Leos Carax and starring Guillaume Depardieu, Yekaterina Golubeva and Catherine Deneuve. The film is loosely based on the Herman Melville novel Pierre: or, The Ambiguities. It revolves around a young novelist who is confronted by a woman who claims to be his lost sister, and the two begin a romantic relationship. The film title is an acronym of the French title of the novel, Pierre ou les ambiguïtés, plus the Roman numeral "X" indicating the tenth draft version of the script that was used to make the film.

The film was entered into the 1999 Cannes Film Festival. Pola X has been associated by some with the New French Extremity.

Plot

Pierre lives a carefree life with his widowed mother in a chateau in Normandy, enjoying rising fame as an author under a pseudonym and writing his second novel, and speeding on his father's old motorbike to sleep with his fiancée and childhood friend Lucie in her parents' chateau. In a bar he sees his cousin (and also childhood friend) Thibault, a stockbroker recently returned to France after a long absence, who says he is welcome to stay at Thibault's apartment in Paris, but wonders why Pierre is being followed by a young vagrant woman. When Pierre turns to look, the woman runs away and escapes despite his attempts to follow.

One night Pierre's mother tells him she has arranged a date for the marriage over his head and he must tell Lucie. Driving through the forest, he is disturbed to see the vagrant woman, who resembles a ghostly figure from his dreams. She runs away, but he catches up with her and she tells him in a strong foreign accent that she is his half-sister Isabelle and recounts her unhappy life. She and her entourage of a young Romanian woman and a small girl are implied to be refugees from conflict in Eastern Europe.

Abandoning his home, mother and fiancée, Pierre takes Isabelle to Paris and goes to see Thibault, who bitterly insists he doesn't recognise the man and throws them out. Wandering the streets of Paris and fearful of deportation, the entourage are reduced to a cheap hotel, Pierre throws out his previous ideas for a second novel in favour of a grittier and more mature work that reflects the hidden truths of life. Seeking funds, he is warned by his publisher that his sophomoric pursuit of harsh truths will result in affected and inferior work compared to the youthful innocence that comes naturally to him, and his request for an advance is rejected.

At the zoo, Pierre misanthropically tells the small girl travelling with the group that the animals act unhappy because to them, all humans stink. The girl is slapped by an adult stranger after telling random people in the street that they stink, falls, and incurs a head wound she later dies from. Again fearful of deportation, Pierre, Isabelle, and the Romanian woman (named 'Razerka' in publicity materials but called by the actress's name 'Petruta' in the film) leave the girl's body and solemnly proceed to a run-down industrial district commandeered by a terroristic cult; it is implied that in exchange for chaperoning the Romanian woman safely to a man she knows there, Pierre and Isabelle are given lodging with the group, who perform training for guerrilla warfare as well as practising instruments in an experimental industrial or noise music arrangement conducts by their leader. Pierre and Isabelle find themselves flung far from the society that stifled the former with the apparent 'false' truths he seeks to dispel, and they succumb to the incestuous passion that had been coalescing til that point in an un-simulated sex scene.

Their relationship taken to its logical climax, Pierre scribbles away at his desk in the cult's warehouse in a monotonous daze punctuated by learning of his mother's death (implied to be a suicide) while trying to learn of his whereabouts. In the winter and suffering from a recurring fever, Lucie finds Pierre at the warehouse and demands to stay there under a false identity to 'protect' Isabelle from the truth of his abandonment of his previous engagement, immediately accepting Pierre's disappearance and relationship with Isabelle out of love for him. Pierre similarly keeps the nature of his ties to Isabelle from Lucie. Isabelle feels inadequate and desperately tries to ingratiate herself further to the two, for example by offering to take care of Lucie during her periods of sickness. In a desperate attempt to raise funds, Pierre makes an ill-advised appearance on television to reveal his penname's true identity only to find some in the television audience disbelieving him and others hostile to his timidness in the face of the society he has shunned and his lack of any remaining emotional or artistic connection to the debut novel that had made him a household name.

Pierre's long days of writing continue through the winter; at one point he dreams of him and Isabelle copulating and then drowning in a river of blood resembling a volcanic crevice. During a walk along the embankment of the Seine, the trio happen upon an autobiography of Pierre's father and he is alarmed when Isabelle does not seem to recognise the man on the cover, supposedly their shared father whom Isabelle said she had met once as an older child. Despairing over the doubt in her she fears she has instilled in Pierre, Isabelle attempts suicide by jumping into the Seine and is sent to hospital where a vengeful Thibault reveals Lucie's true identity to her.

Pierre receives a brutal rejection notice from his publisher after submitting his manuscript anonymously to gauge an unbiased reaction, and Isabelle angrily confronts him over his deception of her. Pierre despairs at the sight of Lucie debasing herself by living in the squat and at the ruination of his plans; he furiously accepts an invitation from Thibault to duke it out and steals a van and two handguns from the cult to confront his cousin in central Paris, where Pierre immediately shoots Thibault in the head and is arrested. In despair at losing Pierre, Isabelle insists to him that she was always telling the truth and throws herself in front of a vehicle as he is driven to jail.

Cast

 Guillaume Depardieu as Pierre
 Yekaterina Golubeva as Isabelle
 Catherine Deneuve as Marie
 Delphine Chuillot as Lucie
 Laurent Lucas as Thibault
 Patachou as Margherite
 Petruta Catana as Razerka
 Mihaella Silaghi as The Child
 Sharunas Bartas as The Chief
 Samuel Dupuy as Fred
 Mathias Mlekuz as TV presenter
 Dine Souli as Taxi driver
 Miguel Yeco as Augusto
 Khireddine Medjoubi as Cafe owner's son
 Mark Zak as Romanian friend
 Anne Kanis as Chef's wife (Anne Richter)
 Till Lindemann as drummer
 Christoph Schneider as drummer

Soundtrack
The soundtrack was produced by Scott Walker and features some instrumental tracks by him, as well as contributions by Sonic Youth and Bill Callahan, who also has a cameo appearance in the film.

Alternate miniseries version
An alternate longer TV version entitled "Pierre ou les ambiguïtés", edited into three episodes containing an additional 40 minutes of footage, was shown for the first time on 24 September 2001 on Arte German-French TV channel. The episodes were titled A la lumière, A l'ombre des lumières and Dans le sang.

Carax edited the TV version in the spirit of serials from his childhood, in particular those by Vidocq. The new scenes in the alternative version were produced during the original shoot with additional budget raised by producer Bruno Pesery to allow them to exceed their contractually agreed 140-minute running time. Some of the new sequences explore the dreams of Peter and his relationship with his mother, sister and fiancée, while others lengthen or alter existing scenes. In an interview with Jacques Morice, Carax stated that, "it is not an 'extended version' or a 'final version' of the film Pola X, but a different proposition for television."

Since the miniseries' original broadcast in 2001, it has only been screened very rarely at exhibition events, and has not received an official release on streaming or home video of any kind to date. In late 2021 a digitised recording of a VHS tape containing this version was illegally leaked onto the internet via an unknown source, and it was translated into English for the first time.

See also
 List of mainstream movies with unsimulated sex

References

External links
 
 
 

1999 films
1999 romantic drama films
1990s erotic drama films
French romantic drama films
Swiss drama films
German erotic drama films
German romantic drama films
French erotic drama films
Films based on American novels
Japanese romantic drama films
1990s French-language films
Films directed by Leos Carax
Films based on works by Herman Melville
Films scored by Scott Walker (singer)
Films set in France
Films shot in France
Films shot in Germany
Films shot in Paris
Incest in film
New French Extremity films
French-language Swiss films
1990s Japanese films
1990s French films
1990s German films